Paul VI International Prize is a prize founded in 1979 by the Paul VI Institute in Brescia, Italy, named in honour of Pope Paul VI. The prize is awarded to individuals or institutions "who, with their studies and their works, have contributed to the growth of the religious meaning in the world."

Recipients 
 1983: Hans Urs von Balthasar
 1988: Olivier Messiaen
 1993: Oscar Cullmann
 1997: Jean Vanier
 2003: Paul Ricœur
 2008: Editors of Sources Chrétiennes
 2013: Joseph Coutts

References

External links 
 Il Premio Internazionale Paolo VI (Italian)

Pope Paul VI
International awards
Catholic ecclesiastical decorations
Italian awards
Awards established in 1979